The Indian python (Python molurus) is a large python species native to tropical and subtropical regions of the Indian subcontinent and Southeast Asia. It is also known by the common names black-tailed python, Indian rock python, and Asian rock python.  Although smaller than its close relative the Burmese python, it is still among the largest snakes in the world. It is generally lighter colored than the Burmese python and reaches usually . Like all pythons, it is nonvenomous.

Description

The rock python's color pattern is whitish or yellowish with the blotched patterns varying from tan to dark brown shades. This varies with terrain and habitat. Specimens from the hill forests of Western Ghats and Assam are darker, while those from the Deccan Plateau and Eastern Ghats are usually lighter. All pythons are non-venomous.

Because of confusion with the Burmese python, exaggerations, and stretched skins in the past, the maximum length of this subspecies is difficult to tell.

Differs from Burmese python (Python bivittatus) by the following signs:
the presence of light "eyes" in the centers of spots located on the sides of the trunk;
reddish or pinkish color of light stripes on the sides of the head;
a diamond - shaped spot on the head blurred in the front part;
usually lighter in color, dominated by brown, reddish-brown, yellowish-brown and grayish-brown tones;
unlike P. bivittatus, which inhabit moist and meadow habitats, it usually prefers drier and arid places;

Distribution and habitat

P. molurus occurs in India, southern Nepal, Pakistan, Sri Lanka, Bhutan, Bangladesh, and probably in the north of Myanmar. It lives in a wide range of habitats, including grasslands, swamps, marshes, rocky foothills, woodlands, open forest, and river valleys. It needs a permanent source of water. It hides in abandoned mammal burrows, hollow trees, dense water reeds, and mangrove thickets.

Behavior

Lethargic and slow moving even in their native habitat, they exhibit timidity and rarely try to attack even when attacked. Locomotion is usually with the body moving in a straight line, by "walking on its ribs". They are excellent swimmers and are quite at home in water. They can be wholly submerged in water for many minutes if necessary, but usually prefer to remain near the bank.

Feeding

Like all snakes, Indian pythons are strict carnivores and feed on mammals, birds, reptiles, and amphibians indiscriminately, but seem to prefer mammals. Roused to activity on sighting prey, the snake advances with a quivering tail and lunges with an open mouth. Live prey is constricted and killed. One or two coils are used to hold it in a tight grip. The prey, unable to breathe, succumbs and is subsequently swallowed head first. After a heavy meal, they are disinclined to move. If forced to, hard parts of the meal may tear through the body. Therefore, if disturbed, some specimens  disgorge their meal to escape from potential predators. After a heavy meal, an individual may fast for weeks, the longest recorded duration being 2 years. The python can swallow prey bigger than its diameter because the jaw bones are not connected. Moreover, prey cannot escape from its mouth because of the arrangement of the teeth (which are reverse saw-like).

Reproduction

Oviparous, up to 100 eggs are laid by a female, which she protects and incubates. Towards this end, they are capable of raising their body temperature above the ambient level through muscular contractions. An artificial incubation method using climate-controlled environmental chambers was developed in India for successfully raising hatchlings from abandoned or unattended eggs.

Conservation status
The Indian python is classified as Near Threatened on the  IUCN Red List due to a likely population decline of ~30% over the decade 2010–2020, caused by habitat loss, over-exploitation, and lack of conservation actions.

A genetic study published in 2017 showed that the Burmese pythons in Florida are hybrids with P. molurus.

Taxonomy
In the literature, one other subspecies may be encountered: P. m. pimbura Deraniyagala, 1945, which is found in Sri Lanka.

The Burmese python (P. bivittatus) was referred to as a subspecies of the Indian python until 2009, when it was elevated to full species status. The name Python molurus bivittatus is found in older literature.

In culture
Kaa, a large and old Indian python, is featured as one of Mowgli's mentors in Rudyard Kipling's 1894 collection The Jungle Book.

References

Further reading

 
 Daniel, JC. The Book Of Indian Snakes and Reptiles. Bombay Natural History Society

External links

 
 Indian Python at Ecology Asia. Accessed 13 September 2007.
 Indian python  at Animal Pictures Archive. Accessed 13 September 2007.
 Watch Indian rock python (Python molurus) video clips from the BBC archive on Wildlife Finder

molurus
Reptiles described in 1758
Reptiles of Southeast Asia
Reptiles of India
Reptiles of Nepal
Reptiles of Pakistan
Reptiles of Bangladesh
Reptiles of Sri Lanka
Reptiles of Bhutan
Reptiles of Myanmar
Fauna of South Asia
Taxa named by Carl Linnaeus